Susana Guenola Zubiri (better known as Susana Freyre) is an Argentine actress. She appeared in 30 films and television shows between 1945 and 1984. She starred in the film Three Loves in Rio, which was entered into the 9th Berlin International Film Festival.

Her mother's surname is Vidal. She began his work in the cinema in 1945 in Las seis suegras de Barba Azul directed by Carlos Hugo Christensen (1914-1999), whom she married and who would direct most of the films in which she participated and accompanied him during his stay in Mexico.

Among her performances she remembers the character of Paula, an aristocrat who came unless she worked as a "call girl" with Fernanda Mistral, in the film PAULA CAUTIVA (1963) in which she participated with Duilio Marzio, Lautaro Murua. Directed by Fernando Ayala, it is about a story by Beatriz Guido, whose action took place during a military revolt in 1962,2 and which earned her the 1964 Silver Condor Award for best actress. There she sings and plays the guitar (works by Astor Piazzolla).

In the theatre she starred in many plays, such as El hombre de mundo by Ventura de la Vega, in the Teatro Nacional Cervantes (1969) with Esteban Serrador and Rosa Rosen.

She filmed in Argentina, Brazil, Venezuela and Mexico.

In 2003, she was awarded the prize for her career by the Association of Film Reporters of Argentina. She received the award together with Elsa Daniel, María Vaner and Duilio Marzio.

In 2012, she presented the Condor de Plata awards (at the Avenida Theatre in Buenos Aires).

On 27 August 2012, at the Tabarís Theater, the SAGAI Foundation presented the "Recognition of the 2012 Trajectory" award to audiovisual figures over 80 years of age.

Filmography 

1945: Swan Song
1945: Sofía
1945: Bluebeard's Six Mothers-in-Law
1946: No salgas esta noche
1946: Becquer's Great Love
1947: Con el diablo en el cuerpo
1948: Una atrevida aventurita
1948: La novia de la marina
1949: ¿Por qué mintió la cigüeña?
1950: La loca de la casa
1951: El demonio es un ángel
1953: Un ángel sin pudor
1955: Leonora of the Seven Seas
1959: Three Loves in Rio
1960: Amor Para Três
1960: Matemática Zero, Amor Dez
1963: Paula cautiva
1964: Me First
1965: Show Standard Electric (TV Mini Series, 9 episodes)
1966: Teatro Grand Guignol (TV Series, 1 episode)
1966: La búsqueda (TV Series, 3 episodes)
1965: El patio de Tlaquepaque (TV Series, 3 episodes)
1966: El despertar (TV Series, 3 episodes)
1966: A orillas del gran silencio (TV Movie)
1967: Mujeres en presidio (TV Series, 19 episodes)
1968: Su comedia favorita (TV Series, 1 episode)
1970: Matrimonios y algo más (TV Series, 3 episodes)
1970: El principio y el fin (TV Series, 19 episodes)
1970: Do... Re... Mi... Papá (TV Series, 19 episodes)
1971: Teatro 13 (TV Series, 2 episodes)
1971: Nosotros también reímos (TV Series, 18 episodes)
1971: Ciclo de teatro argentino (TV Series, 1 episode)
1972: La buena gente (TV Series, 3 episodes)
1973: Teatro como en el teatro (TV Series)
1974: Enséñame a quererte (TV Series, 39 episodes)
1974: La flor de la mafia
1979: Somos nosotros (TV Series, 19 episodes)
1981: Eugenia (TV Series, 19 episodes)
1982: Todo tuyo (TV Series, 16 episodes)
1982: La búsqueda (TV Series, 3 episodes)
1983: Cuando es culpable el amor (TV Series, 19 episodes)
1983: Cara a cara (TV Series, 80 episodes)
1984: Entre el amor y el poder (TV Series, 59 episodes)
2020: El Tabarís, lleno de estrellas (TV Movie)

References

External links

Year of birth missing (living people)
Living people
Argentine film actresses
Actresses from Rosario, Santa Fe
Argentine television actresses
20th-century Argentine actresses